Entergalactic (stylized in all caps) is an adult animated music television special created by American musician and actor Kid Cudi, that serves as a visual companion piece to the album of the same name. Initially announced as a television series, in August 2022, Entergalactic was then redeveloped as a TV special. The special premiered on September 30, 2022, exclusively on Netflix, simultaneously with the album.

Based on the album, which Cudi recorded before storyboarding the TV special, it was directed by Fletcher Moules. Alongside Cudi, it stars the voices of Jessica Williams, Timothée Chalamet, Ty Dolla Sign, Laura Harrier, Vanessa Hudgens, Christopher Abbott, 070 Shake, Teyana Taylor, Jaden Smith, Keith David, Arturo Castro, and Macaulay Culkin.

A romantic comedy, Entergalactic uses an art style inspired by that of I Lost My Body (2019) and Spider-Man: Into the Spider-Verse (2018). Billed as a "television event", it received critical acclaim for its animation, visual style, music, and story. Entergalactic is dedicated to Cudi's deceased friend, American fashion designer Virgil Abloh, who served as a costume designer on the project before his death, with the release date coinciding with Abloh's birth date.

Plot
Jabari is a charming, streetwear-clad artist on the cusp of real success. After a chance run-in with his cool new photographer neighbor, Meadow, Jabari has to figure out whether he can make space for love in his life.

Voice cast

Production

Development
On July 23, 2019, Netflix announced that Kid Cudi and Ian Edelman would write and produce what was originally going to be an animated music TV series adaptation of Cudi's album Entergalactic. Cudi had previously collaborated with Edelman in 2010, on the HBO series How to Make It in America. Cudi serves as an executive producer alongside Kenya Barris, through their respective production companies Mad Solar and Khalabo Ink Society.

In a November 2019 interview, when speaking on the dual projects, Kenya Barris said, "The idea of there's never been an album and a series dropped at the same time, so each song will have a 30-minute narrative that kind of explains what that song is about and it's a love story . . . It's a youthful love story told through Cudi's music."

In September 2021, Cudi took to Twitter to thank the team that helped bring the project to fruition, and reassured fans they wouldn't be disappointed: "Wait til y'all hear and see Entergalactic. [You] have no idea. I really wanna thank Kenya Barris, Mike Moon, Elizabeth Porter and the whole team for believing in my vision and helping bring it to life. Everything about this show is next level. Ull see."

In an August 2022 interview with Esquire, Cudi revealed he recorded the music first—"a suite of songs on the beauty of being freed by love"—and worked backward to storyboard the narrative before hiring a writing team to script it.

On August 25, 2022, it was announced in a press release Entergalactic would instead be released as a television special. On October 1, Cudi clarified on Twitter: "Its a series but done in a very unique way broken up into chapters not episodes designed for binging! So, it feels like a movie [because] its an hour and a half and can be seen in one sitting but this is a series. Hope that makes sense. The goal is for more seasons."

Casting
In July 2019, Cudi was cast in the series. In June 2022, Jessica Williams, Timothée Chalamet, Ty Dolla Sign, Laura Harrier, Vanessa Hudgens, Christopher Abbott, 070 Shake, Teyana Taylor, Jaden Smith, Keith David, Arturo Castro, and Macaulay Culkin were revealed to be the rest of the cast. On June 8, Cudi revealed his real-life older sister, Maisha, would voice his on-screen older sister Ellie, among other voices.

Animation, design, and influences
The animation was handled by DNEG Animation in London, which also co-produced the special. A 3D map of New York was downloaded and rebuilt in the pipeline. Influences for the film's design were I Lost My Body (2019) and When Harry Met Sally... (1989).

Music 

Kid Cudi's eighth solo album Entergalactic doubles as a soundtrack for the TV special. The album consists of original songs performed by Cudi, of which the TV special is based on.

Additionally, a film score composed entirely by American record producers Dot da Genius and Plain Pat, was released on October 14, 2022, by Netflix Music, LLC.

Other songs featured in the TV special include “By Design” by Kid Cudi featuring André 3000, “Inside My Love” by Minnie Riperton, “In My Bed (So So Def Mix)” by Dru Hill and “Feudal Castle” by Derek Fiechter and Brandon Fiechter.

All music composed by Dot da Genius and Plain Pat, except where noted.

Release
On September 15, 2021, Cudi revealed that the series, and the album, is set to premiere in 2022. In September 2021, Cudi released a short trailer in promotion for the Netflix series, which revealed the music would be produced by his longtime collaborators Dot da Genius and Plain Pat.

On April 24, 2022, Cudi wrote on Twitter: "Entergalactic is gonna be something really fucking special. Minds will melt. This cast?? The MUSIC?? Listen. [You] heard it here first. Remember this tweet. Stay tuned for more news in June!" On June 8, Netflix unveiled the "first look" at Entergalactic, in a trailer that also revealed the cast.

On June 10, the first original song created for the series, titled "Do What I Want", was issued on streaming platforms as the album's first official single. On July 12, Cudi revealed on Twitter, the official trailer for the show will premiere in August, featuring two new songs, with one of the songs set to be released as the second single. On September 12, Netflix unveiled a new trailer for Entergalactic, which included the aforementioned single, "Willing to Trust".

Reception 
 On Metacritic, which uses a weighted average, Entergalactic has received a score of 77 out of 100 based on 10 critic reviews, indicating "generally favorable reviews".

Rendy Jones of Paste wrote "Entergalactic is as sweet a romantic comedy as it is an ethereal animated odyssey. It's a stylish, colorful love letter to animation and the simplicity of Black love in the modern age. It feels like the lovechild between When Harry Met Sally and Spider-Verse for a Black demographic, who deserve stories like this no matter what medium they're presented in." Chase Hutchinson of Collider wrote "A rare gem of an animated work, Kid Cudi guides us on a sublime journey that explores the bond between two people drawn together by love."

Justin Charity of The Ringer wrote "It's saucy and cute, which is to say, it's a sharp attitude adjustment for such a dreary rapper and refreshingly effective as such. Netflix's Entergalactic is a feature-length promotional complement to his latest album, but it's also a creative breakthrough in its own right." Rachel Ho of Exclaim! gave it a 8/10 rating, stating "the story of Jabari and Meadow may be one we all know very well, but it's the world of Entergalactic that captures the imagination, sonically and visually."

Joshua Alston of Variety concluded with "what's available of Entergalactic is frequently intoxicating. Director Fletcher Moules doesn't miss a single opportunity to add beautifully animated flourishes to the script written by Mescudi, Ian Edelman, and Maurice Williams. There are sublime musical numbers, for lack of a better term, that let Mescudi's music breathe and crank the visuals to 11. But the shifts between Entergalactics spacy elements and its grounded moments aren't always smooth, another consequence of the series-to-special evolution. There's much to love about Mescudi's love story, except the fact that there isn't more of it to love."

Accolades

Future
On October 1, 2022, Kid Cudi revealed via Twitter that while Entergalactic was "like a movie", its purpose was closer to that of a television pilot, revealing that he intended to produce "more seasons" ("hour and a half"-long films) making up an Entergalactic series, per the project's original announcement as being a television series. In December 2022, Cudi revealed that although Entergalactic is a standalone special, he is working on a new animated project.

References

External links
 
 
 

2022 films
2022 animated films
2022 computer-animated films
2022 romantic comedy-drama films
2020s American animated films
2020s American television specials
2020s animated television specials
2020s British animated films
2020s English-language films
2020s hip hop films
2020s musical comedy-drama films
2020s romantic musical films
Adult animated comedy films
African-American comedy-drama films
African-American musical films
African-American romantic comedy films
African-American romantic drama films
American adult animated films
American animated musical films
American films about cannabis
American musical comedy-drama films
American romantic comedy-drama films
American romantic musical films
Animated films about music and musicians
Animated films set in New York City
Animated romance films
Animation based on real people
British adult animated films
British films about cannabis
British musical comedy-drama films
British romantic comedy-drama films
British romantic musical films
English-language Netflix original films
Films about hallucinogens
Hip hop television
Kid Cudi
Love stories
Mad Solar productions
Music television specials
Netflix Animation films
Netflix specials
Pop music films
Visual albums
Stoner films